Trimerina is a genus of shore flies, insects in the family Ephydridae.

Species
T. albitarsis Canzoneri & Rampini, 1998
T. bettellai Canzoneri, 1995
T. indistincta Krivosheina, 2004
T. intemeliae Canzoneri & Meneghini, 1982
T. madizans (Fallén, 1813)
T. microchaeta Hendel, 1932
T. shatalkini Krivosheina, 1993

References

Ephydridae
Brachycera genera
Diptera of Europe
Diptera of Asia
Taxa named by Pierre-Justin-Marie Macquart